Junji Yuasa (born 12 October 1944) is a Japanese diver. He competed at the 1968 Summer Olympics and the 1972 Summer Olympics.

References

1944 births
Living people
Japanese male divers
Olympic divers of Japan
Divers at the 1968 Summer Olympics
Divers at the 1972 Summer Olympics
Sportspeople from Osaka
20th-century Japanese people